Gottolengo is a town and comune in the province of Brescia, in Lombardy. As of 2011 Gottolengo had a population of 5,368.

Sources

Cities and towns in Lombardy